West End is an unincorporated community located within Long Branch in Monmouth County, New Jersey, United States. The township was the host of the Long Branch Horse Show at the Hollywood Park Racetrack in 1917.

Notable people

People who were born in, residents of, or otherwise closely associated with Long Branch include:
 Norman Tanzman (1918–2004), politician who served in the New Jersey General Assembly from 1962 to 1968 and in the New Jersey Senate from 1968 to 1974.

References

Long Branch, New Jersey
Unincorporated communities in Monmouth County, New Jersey
Unincorporated communities in New Jersey